Sokoura is a village in the Mangodara Department of Comoé Province in south-western Burkina Faso. The village has a population of 1,611. There is another village called Sokoura in Mangodara Department; the two are distinguished in government documentation by Roman numerals after their names.

References

Populated places in the Cascades Region
Comoé Province